Margaret of Mar (died c. 1391) was Countess of Mar, an ancient earldom in Scotland, in her own right.

She was a daughter of Domhnall II of Mar and after the death of her childless brother Thomas became Countess of Mar. She had married William Douglas, 1st Earl of Douglas, who was succeeded by their son, James Douglas, 2nd Earl of Douglas and Earl of Mar and Garioch in right of his mother. But he was killed in 1388, leading the Scots at the Battle of Otterburn.

Margaret was succeeded by her daughter, Isabel, who became Countess of Mar, possessed the Lordship of the Garioch, and also became the Countess of the unentailed lands of the House of Douglas.

External links
 Women in power
 The Ancient Earldom of Mar

Earls or mormaers of Mar
Mar, Margaret, Countess of
1390s deaths
14th-century Scottish women
14th-century Scottish earls
Year of birth unknown
Year of death uncertain